The Loveland Reporter-Herald is a daily newspaper published in Berthoud, Colorado. It carries local, regional, national and World news. It is owned by Prairie Mountain Publishing, a subsidiary of MediaNews Group, who purchased the paper in 2011.

History
The Loveland Reporter-Herald was acquired in 1967 by Ed and Ruth Lehman, who had previously bought the Longmont Times-Call (1957) and went on to acquire the Cañon City Daily Record (1978). Lehman Communication was continued by the next generation of the Lehman family. The newspaper group was expanded with the Erie Review, Lafayette News, Louisville Times and Superior Observer that were combined into the Colorado Hometown Weekly.

Prairie Mountain Publishing acquired Lehman Communication in 2011.

Location
The offices were held in 201 E. Fifth St., Loveland, Colorado from 1993 to 2017. The paper is as of 2017 based out of neighboring Berthoud, Colorado. From 1956 to 1993, the Reporter-Herald offices were across Fifth Street in what became the Community Health Center. In all, the Reporter-Herald had been in downtown Loveland for more than 100 years, in various locations.

References

External links

Official website (Mobile)

Newspapers published in Colorado
Loveland, Colorado
MediaNews Group publications